The 2019 Liga 1 Putri season was the inaugural season of Liga 1 Putri, the top-flight Indonesian league for women's association football. The season started on 5 October 2019 and finished with two-legged finals on 22 and 28 December 2019.

Persib Putri won the title after defeating TIRA-Persikabo Kartini 6–1 on aggregate.

Teams 
Ten teams competed in the league. From the 18 current men's Liga 1 teams, eight didn't field a women's team.

Note: Flags indicate national team as has been defined under FIFA eligibility rules. Players and coaches may hold more than one non-FIFA nationality.

Schedule and venue
The schedule of the competition was as follows:

Notes:

Group stage 
The draw for the group stage was held on 8 September 2019 at the Hotel Sultan in Jakarta. The 10 teams are drawn into two groups of five.

In each group, teams played a four-series home tournament with five matches for each series. The winners and runner-ups from each group advanced to semi-finals.

Group A

Group B

Knockout stage

Bracket

Semi-finals 

Persib Putri won 2–0 on aggregate.

PSSI Disciplinary Committee awarded a 3–0 win to TIRA-Persikabo Kartini because Galanita Persipura refused to continue the match. TIRA-Persikabo Kartini won 7–5 on aggregate.

Finals 

Persib Putri won 6–1 on aggregate.

Top goalscorers

Awards
 Fair Play Team: TIRA-Persikabo Kartini
 Best Young Player: Helsya Maeisyaroh (TIRA-Persikabo Kartini)
 Best Player: Reva Octaviani (Persib Putri)

References

Indonesia
2019
2019 in Indonesian football leagues